Utkan Demirci  is a Professor with tenure at Stanford University at the departments of Radiology and Electrical Engineering (by courtesy), and serves as the Interim Division Chief and Director of the Canary Center at Stanford for Cancer Early Detection in the Department of Radiology. https://profiles.stanford.edu/utkan-demirci He serves as the principal investigator for the Bio-acoustic MEMS in Medicine Lab (BAMM) at the Canary Center at Stanford University for Cancer Early Detection. Prior to returning to  Stanford, he was an associate professor of medicine at Brigham and Women's Hospital, Harvard Medical School and at Harvard-MIT Division of Health Sciences and Technology serving at the Division of Biomedical Engineering, Division of Infectious Diseases and Renal Division. In 2006, he was named in the MIT Technology Review TR35 as one of the top 35 innovators in the world under the age of 35. 

He has published over 200 peer-reviewed journal articles, 24 book chapters, 7 edited books, and several hundred abstracts and proceedings, as well as having over 25 patents and disclosures pending or granted. He has mentored and trained hundreds of mentees who have become successful scientists, entrepreneurs and academicians and fostered research and industry collaborations around the world. Dr. Demirci has received the NSF CAREER Award, and IEEE EMBS Early Career Award. He is a fellow of the American Institute for Medical and Biological Engineering (AIMBE), and Distinguished Investigator of the Academy for Radiology and Biomedical Imaging Research and serves as an editorial board member for a number of peer-reviewed journals. 

The BAMM Lab group focuses on developing innovative extracellular vesicle isolation tools, point-of-care technologies and creating microfluidic platforms for early cancer detection with broad applications to multiple diseases including infertility and HIV. Dr. Demirci’s lab has collaborated with over 50 research groups and industry partners around the world. His seminal work in microfluidics has led to the development of innovative FDA-approved platform technologies in medicine and many of his inventions have been industry licensed. He holds several FDA-approved and CE-marked technologies that have been widely used by fertility clinics with assisted reproductive technologies leading to thousands of live births globally and in the US. 
Dr. Demirci is a serial academic entrepreneur and the co-founder of DxNow (https://www.linkedin.com/company/dxnow-inc-), Zymot (https://www.zymotfertility.com/), Levitas Bio (https://levitasbio.com/), Mercury Bio and Koek Biotech and serves as advisor to early stage companies.

Education 
Demirci received his B.S. degree in electrical engineering in 1999 as a James B. Angell Scholar (summa cum laude) from University of Michigan in Ann Arbor. He received his M.S. degree in 2001 in electrical engineering, his M.S. degree in management science and engineering in 2005, and his Ph.D. in electrical engineering in 2005, all from Stanford University.

References

External links 
 Demirci's biosketch web site

Year of birth missing (living people)
Living people
University of Michigan College of Engineering alumni
Stanford University School of Engineering alumni
Harvard Medical School faculty
Kadıköy Anadolu Lisesi alumni